In the 2003 French Open tennis tournament, the boys' singles competition was won by Stan Wawrinka of Switzerland.

Seeds

  Marcos Baghdatis (quarterfinals)
  Nicolás Almagro (semifinals)
  Dudi Sela (quarterfinals)
  Jo-Wilfried Tsonga (semifinals)
  Stanislas Wawrinka (champion)
  Brian Baker (final)
  Daniel Gimeno Traver (quarterfinals)
  Mathieu Montcourt (quarterfinals)
  Florin Mergea (third round)
  György Balázs (third round)
  Bruno Rosa (first round)
  Chris Guccione (second round)
  Chris Kwon (first round)
  Andy Murray (third round)
  Luis Flores (third round)
  Leonardo Kirche (second round)

Draw

Final eight

Top half

Section 1

Section 2

Section 3

Section 4

Sources

Boyssingles
2003